is a passenger railway station in located in the city of Yao, Osaka Prefecture, Japan, operated by West Japan Railway Company (JR West).

Lines

Station layout
The station consists of two opposed side platforms connected by a footbridge. The station is staffed.

Platforms

History 
Shiki Station opened on 1 April 1909. With the privatization of the Japan National Railways (JNR) on 1 April 1987, the station came under the aegis of the West Japan Railway Company.

Station numbering was introduced in March 2018 with Shiki being assigned station number JR-Q26.

Passenger statistics
In fiscal 2019, the station was used by an average of 10,525 passengers daily (boarding passengers only).

Surrounding Area
 Yuge Jinja
 Nagase River
 Yao City Hall Shiki Branch Office
 Shiki Community Center
 Yao City Shiki Library

See also
List of railway stations in Japan

References

External links

 Shiki Station Official Site

Railway stations in Osaka Prefecture
Railway stations in Japan opened in 1909
Yao, Osaka